The D.O.P. Foundation is a non-profit institution with spaces and documentary archives headquartered in Paris (France), Madrid (Spain), Miami (U.S.A.) and Caracas (Venezuela)  that operates as an educational and lending resource of modern and contemporary art. The Foundation is dedicated to building a collection that reflects the scope and diversity of the art of our time.

This Foundation assists museums striving to present modern and contemporary art in a complex economic and cultural environment. While private collectors usually limit the accessibility of contemporary artists' work, the  Foundation makes the collection's works available for loan to museums and university galleries through its "lending library" program. Since its inception in 1999, artworks from the D.O.P. Collection (Colección D.O.P.) have appeared in exhibitions at nearly 50 museums, universities, web sites and other public venues, and have been viewed by approximately one million persons per year.

The Foundation facilitates its lending programs by providing professionals and scholars in the art community opportunities to view, study, and consider the collection´s artworks for exhibitions worldwide.

The main educational initiatives of the D.O.P. Foundation are: The D.O.P. Collection, the Lending Library Programme and its ArteDOP/ArtDOP Educational Initiative, all aimed to achieve the excellence in education by a display of exhibitions, a grant & scholarship programs and other activities that allows a direct access of people interested in understanding the importance and enjoy the multiple alternatives that art brings as a fundamental factor for our intellectual, social and emotive development; and these are directed to anyone, from individual beings up to a whole community.

Exhibitions
The exhibitions change often.

Some exhibitions on D.O.P. Foundation:
 2009 : Arturo Herrera - "Ruinas Circulares" - José Antonío Hernández Diez en la Colección D.O.P. -   
 2010 : Cy Twombly - "Grey Paintings" - Alejandro Otero - " Presence and Color at the D.O.P. Foundation" -
 2011 : Jesús Rafael Soto - " Abstraction, Pasión & Mouvement" - Nobuyoshi Araki - "Desire Objects" -  Maria Fernanda Cardoso - "Appearance and Content" - Chema Madoz - "Metamorphosis of Thought" - Robert Longo - "A Short Fiction"
 2012 : Still:Life /Naturaleza:Muerta (Includes work by Sam Taylor-Wood and Vik Muniz) - Abstraction and Geometry from Southern Cone (include works by Rogelio Polesello, Fernando Maza, J.A. Fernandez Muro and others)- Ramsés Larzábal - "Ser, To Be, Être" - Paul Signac - "L´Olympe: Impressions intimes d´une âme errante" - Alberto Asprino - "Antropometrías Indelebles" - Omer Fast - "Omer Fast artworks from the D.O.P. Collection"
 2013 : The Landscape. Contemporary & Cutting Edge (Includes work by Jean-Marc Bustamante, Vik Muniz, Nayland Blake, Nicholas Hakebourne and others) - Tony Oursler - "Tony Oursler artworks from the D.O.P. Collection"
2014: "ZERO Exhibition" (in collaboration with) Fundação Iberê Camargo, Museu Oscar Niemeyer y Pinacoteca do Estado de São Paulo.- "Deconstruction & Postmodernism - Session I" (Includes work by Jeff Koons, Yoshitomo Nara, Takashi Murakami, Desire Obtain Cherish) - Sigfredo Chacón Artworks from The D.O.P. Collection" - "Framing (Enmarcando a) Gerd Leufert" (in collaboration with Sala TAC) - 
2015: "Vik Muniz" - MOMA Equivalents - Fundación D.O.P. (D.O.P. Foundation), Caracas, Venezuela. - "POP" Peña - Obregón - Perna (in collaboration with Odalys Galería)  - "Oswaldo Vigas - Witches y Personages".
2016: "Crying Man Series by Sam Taylor-Johnson at D.O.P. Collection" - Roberto Obregón "Collages" - "Gego: Autobiography of a line" (in collaboration with Dominique Levy Gallery). - "The Delightfully Bizarre World Of Contemporary Ceramics".

References

 , page 7, 

Rolando G. Marrero (Aug. 22, 2012) "Fundacion D.O.P. expone obras de Paul Signac" - Arte en la Red

TAL CUAL (Aug.08, 2011) Yohana Silveira "Erotismo y Muerte en Fundacion D.O.P." Caracas, Back cover,

External links
D.O.P. Foundation website

Foundations based in France
Foundations based in Spain
Foundations based in Venezuela
Arts foundations based in the United States